Sulfoxone or aldesulfone sodium is an anti-leprosy drug. It is also known as diasone. Sulfoxone sodium was introduced in Japan in 1948. Ernest Muir introduced it to Western use while serving as superintendent of the Chacachacare Leprosarium on Trinidad in the Caribbean.

References

Anilines
Sulfonamides
Antileprotic drugs
Sulfonamide antibiotics
Organic sodium salts